Jeffrey Locke Elman (January 22, 1948 – June 28, 2018) was an American psycholinguist and professor of cognitive science at the University of California, San Diego (UCSD). He specialized in the field of neural networks.

In 1990, he introduced the simple recurrent neural network (SRNN), also known as the 'Elman network', which is capable of processing sequentially ordered stimuli, and has since become widely used.

Elman's work was highly significant to our understanding of how languages are acquired and also, once acquired, how sentences are comprehended.  Sentences in natural languages are composed of sequences of words that are organized in phrases and hierarchical structures.  The Elman network provides an important hypothesis for how neural networks—and, by analogy, the human brain—might be doing the learning and processing of such structures.

Early life
Elman attended Palisades High School in Pacific Palisades, California, then Harvard University, where he graduated in 1969.  He received his Ph.D. from the University of Texas at Austin in 1977.

Career
With Jay McClelland, Elman developed the TRACE model of speech perception in the mid-80s. TRACE remains a highly influential model that has stimulated a large body of empirical research.

In 1990, he introduced the simple recurrent neural network (SRNN; aka 'Elman network'), which is a widely used recurrent neural network that is capable of processing sequentially ordered stimuli. Elman nets are used in a number of fields, including cognitive science, psychology, economics and physics, among many others.

In 1996, he co-authored (with Annette Karmiloff-Smith, Elizabeth Bates, Mark H. Johnson, Domenico Parisi, and Kim Plunkett), the book Rethinking Innateness, which argues against a strong nativist (innate) view of development.

Elman was an Inaugural Fellow of the Cognitive Science Society, and also was its president, from 1999 to 2000. He was awarded an honorary doctorate from the New Bulgarian University, and was the 2007 recipient of the David E. Rumelhart Prize for Theoretical Contributions to Cognitive Science. He was founding co-director of the Kavli Institute for Brain and Mind at UC San Diego, and holds the Chancellor's Associates Endowed Chair. He was Dean of Social Sciences at UCSD from 2008 until June 2014.  Elman was also a founding co-director of the UCSD Halıcıoğlu Data Science Institute, announced March 1, 2018.

Elman died of a heart condition on June 28, 2018, at the age of 70.

References

External links
 Personal website
 UC San Diego Department of Cognitive Science
 Center for Research in Language, UCSD
 Kavli Institute for Brain & Mind, UCSD
 Cognitive Science Society
 Halıcıoğlu Data Science Institute 

1948 births
2018 deaths
20th-century American psychologists
Psycholinguists
Speech perception researchers
University of California, San Diego faculty
Rumelhart Prize laureates
Harvard University alumni
Fellows of the Cognitive Science Society
University of Texas at Austin College of Liberal Arts alumni
Linguists from the United States